Jamil Smith may refer to:

 Jamil Smith (journalist), American television reporter and writer
 Jamil Walker Smith, American actor